Scepter Records was an American record company founded in 1959 by Florence Greenberg.

History
Florence Greenberg founded Scepter Records from the $4,000 she received after she sold Tiara Records and the Shirelles to Decca Records. When the Shirelles didn't produce any hits for Decca, they were given back to Greenberg, who promptly signed them.

By 1961, Greenberg had launched a subsidiary, Wand Records. Through the two labels, she launched the careers of not only the Shirelles, but Dionne Warwick, Chuck Jackson, the Kingsmen, B.J. Thomas, Joey Dee, Maxine Brown, the Esquires, Tommy Hunt, the Guess Who, Tammi Terrell, the Independents and B. T. Express, and gave the Isley Brothers their famous hit "Twist and Shout", which was later covered by the Beatles. Another related label was Citation Records, "a Scepter Records subsidiary/series that featured a fake gold record on every cover, advertising the 'best of' (Joe) Tex, Flip Wilson, Deep Purple, Wilson Pickett, the Isley Brothers, and anything else they could lease (or own the rights to)." Other Scepter/Wand subsidiary labels include: Bamboo, Bunky, Cap City, Captain, Garrison, Jet Stream, Lanie, Madtad, Marlu, Mosaic, Pepper, Realm, Roadshow, Rock'N, Sonday, Spokane, Stop, Tiffany, Toddlin' Town and Treat.

In 1965, Scepter moved its offices to 254 West 54th Street in Manhattan, New York City (a building now famous for housing the legendary Studio 54 disco). The building included warehouse space and its own recording studio. Though few albums of note were recorded at Scepter Studios, one was the influential experimental rock album The Velvet Underground & Nico, much of which was recorded there in April 1966, by engineer John Licata under the supervision of Andy Warhol and Norman Dolph.

Scepter was one of the earliest record labels to release 12-inch singles intended for the nascent disco market. During this revival of the label during the disco era in the 1970s, the label featured LTG Exchange, South Shore Commission, Ultra High Frequency, General Crook, Southside Movement, Aramada Orchestra and Bobby Moore.

Its main producer, Luther Dixon, was unparalleled in his field as a songwriter for years. It was at Scepter that Burt Bacharach came into prominence as a writer and producer.

Greenberg decided to retire from the business in 1976, and sold her record labels to Springboard International. When Springboard went bankrupt, Gusto Records acquired the catalog. Dionne Warwick arranged to buy her own masters, and the Kingsmen won control of their masters via a highly publicized lawsuit.

In March 2011, the musical Baby It's You!, which told the story of Greenberg and the development of Scepter Records, premiered on Broadway to lukewarm-to-poor reviews.

Roster
 Maxine Brown
 B. T. Express
 Joey Dee
 The Esquires (Bunky)
Great Bear
 The Guess Who (Chad Allan & The Expressions)
 Roy Head
 Tommy Hunt
 Jimmie Raye
 The Independents
 The Isley Brothers
 Chuck Jackson
 The Kingsmen
 Loretta Long
 LTG Exchange
 Merrilee Rush
 The Shirelles
 South Shore Commission
 Tammi Terrell
 B. J. Thomas
 Ultra High Frequency
 Dionne Warwick
 The Rocky Fellers
Beverly Bremers

See also
 List of record labels

References

External links
The Scepter Records Story
45 Discography

American record labels
Record labels established in 1959
Record labels disestablished in 1976